Les Echos may refer to:
 Les Echos (France), a French-language financial newspaper published in France
 Les Echos (Mali), a French-language newspaper published in Bamako, Mali

See also
 Echoes (disambiguation)
 L'Echo,  a French-language financial newspaper published in Belgium